10 Canis Majoris is a single variable star in the southern constellation of Canis Major, located roughly 1,980 light years away from the Sun. It has the variable star designation FT Canis Majoris; 10 Canis Majoris is the Flamsteed designation. This body is visible to the naked eye as a faint, blue-white hued star with a baseline apparent visual magnitude of 5.23. It is moving away from the Earth with a heliocentric radial velocity of +34 km/s.

This is a massive Be star with a stellar classification of B2 V, matching a B-type main-sequence star. Hiltner et al. (1969) found a giant class of B2 IIIe, which is still in use with some studies. The star is spinning rapidly with a projected rotational velocity of 205 km/s and a rotational period of 2.63 days. This is giving it an oblate shape with an equatorial bulge that is 5% larger than the polar radius. The axis of rotation is inclined by an angle of 45° to the line of sight from the Earth. Samus et al. (2017) classify it as a Be-type variable star that ranges from a peak visual magnitude of 5.13 down to 5.44 with a rotationally-modulated period of 2.63 days.

10 Canis Majoris is 8.2 million years old with 19.2 times the mass of the Sun and 10 times the Sun's radius. It is radiating around 44,000 times the luminosity of the Sun from its photosphere at an effective temperature of 25,000 K. There is a magnitude 12.58 visual companion at an angular separation of  along a position angle of 99°, as of 2015.

References

B-type main-sequence stars
B-type giants
Be stars
Canis Major
Durchmusterung objects
Canis Majoris, 10
048917
032292
2492
Canis Majoris, FT